Aron Gajarszki is a Hungarian sprint canoer and marathon canoeist who competed in the late 1990s. He won a bronze medal in the C-4 1000 m event at the 1999 ICF Canoe Sprint World Championships in Milan.

References

Hungarian male canoeists
Living people
Year of birth missing (living people)
ICF Canoe Sprint World Championships medalists in Canadian